Wengler is a German surname. Notable people with this surname include:

 Heinz Wengler (1912–1942), German bicycle racer
 Marcel Wengler (born 1946), Luxembourg composer and conductor
 Maximilian Wengler (1890–1945), World War II German general

See also
 Wengler, California - see List of places in California (W)